Dual specificity protein phosphatase 10 is an enzyme that in humans is encoded by the DUSP10 gene.

Dual specificity protein phosphatases inactivate their target kinases by dephosphorylating both the phosphoserine/threonine and phosphotyrosine residues. They negatively regulate members of the MAPK superfamily (MAPK/ERK, SAPK/JNK, p38), which is associated with cellular proliferation and differentiation. Different members of this family of dual specificity phosphatases show distinct substrate specificities for MAPKs, different tissue distribution and subcellular localization, and different modes of inducibility of their expression by extracellular stimuli. This gene product binds to and inactivates p38 and SAPK/JNK, but not MAPK/ERK. Its subcellular localization is unique; it is evenly distributed in both the cytoplasm and the nucleus. This gene is widely expressed in various tissues and organs, and its expression is elevated by stress stimuli. Three transcript variants encoding two different isoforms have been found for this gene.

Interactions
DUSP10 has been shown to interact with MAPK14 and MAPK8.

References

Further reading

EC 3.1.3